Grammoechus bipartitus is a species of beetle in the family Cerambycidae. It was described by Ritsema in 1890. It is known from Java and Borneo.

References

Pteropliini
Beetles described in 1890